Molumeh (also Romanized as Molūmeh and Malūmeh; also known as Mūlameh) is a village in Deylaman Rural District, Deylaman District, Siahkal County, Gilan Province, Iran. At the 2006 census, its population was 266, in 95 families.

References 

Populated places in Siahkal County